Charles L. Russell (1844 – June 7, 1910) was an American Corporal in the U.S. Army who served with the 93rd New York Volunteer Infantry during the American Civil War. He received the Medal of Honor for extraordinary heroism after capturing the flag of the 42nd Virginia Infantry during the Battle of Spotsylvania Court House.  He received the Medal of Honor on December 1, 1864.

Biography
Russell was born in Malone, New York in 1844 and served in the United States Army during the American Civil War.  Following the war, he died and was buried at the Hot Springs National Cemetery in Hot Springs, South Dakota.

References

1844 births
1910 deaths
Union Army officers
United States Army Medal of Honor recipients
American Civil War recipients of the Medal of Honor
People from Malone, New York